The Toleman TG280 is an open-wheel ground effect Formula 2 racing car, developed and made by Toleman for the European Formula Two Championship, in 1980. It was designed by South African designer and engineer Rory Byrne. It successfully won and completely dominated the European F2 Championship in 1980, with Brian Henton and Derek Warwick finishing 1st and 2nd in the championship standings. It was powered by the  Hart 420R  four-cylinder engine, which droves the rear wheels via a Hewland F.T.200 5-speed manual transmission. After Formula 2 racing, it was later converted into a Can-Am-style prototype, and used in the European-based Interserie series.

References

Formula Two cars
1970s cars
1980s cars
Cars of England